WUCL (105.7 MHz, "105.7 The Legend") is a classic country FM radio station broadcasting in the Meridian, Mississippi, area.

WUCL is part of the Alert FM digital alert and messaging system for Lauderdale County first responders.

History
On October 28, 2016, the then-WJXM changed their format from urban contemporary (which moved to WKZB 95.1 FM Marion, MS) to classic country, branded as "Classic Country 105.7" (format moved from WUCL 97.9 FM Newton, MS). The station took on the WUCL call sign on November 8, 2016.

References

External links

UCL (FM)
Radio stations established in 1999
1999 establishments in Mississippi